Bad Since '97 is the second studio extended play by Nigerian singer-songwriter BNXN, formerly known as Buju. It was released on 26 August 2022 by TYE and distributed by Empire Distribution. The EP features guest appearances from Wizkid, Olamide and Wande Coal and combines elements from R&B, Afro Fusion, Afrobeats, and Afropop with Neo-soul percussive rhythms. Bad Since '97 received favourable reviews from critics, and topped charts In UK, US, Netherlands, and other countries.

Critical reception

In a review for OkayAfrica, they wrote that "The project highlights BNXN's adaptability, lyrical intelligence, and development as a whole. His 24-year-development old's as an artist and dedication to promoting his skills internationally are demonstrated on it. His expanding fan base has further solidified the musician's expanding prominence in the music business."

In a review for Pulse Nigeria, Adebayo Adebiyi credited BNXN for "purposefully highlighting his accomplishments since the release of his debut tape in his second endeavour. In Bad Since '97, he asserts that he is an artist who possesses distinctive characteristics and audaciously compares the quality of his creativity to that of the tallest skyscraper in the world. The progression is nice despite the melody's predictability. Emmanuel Daraloye of AfroCritik calls it a well sequenced story and a resurgence of artistry.

Track listing

Charts

Personnel

Credits adapted from Spotify.
Daniel Benson - Primary artist, writer.
Abifade Tosin Tomide (Bayarn) - Executive producer
DNZL - Production (1)
Sak Pase - Production (1, 4, 6)
TSB - Production (2)
Juls - Production (3)
Blaisebeats - Production (5 & 7)
Steph - Production (6 & 7)

Release history

References

2022 EPs